Udal may refer to the following topics:

Film 

 Udal (film) - 2022 Indian Malayalam language film

Legal 

 Udal law - Legal system of Shetland and Orkney

Location 

 Kampong Bukit Udal - A village named after a nearby hill, Bukit Udal.

People 

 Udal of Mahoba - Rajput warrior
 Udal (politician) - Indian state politician

See also 

 Udal (surname) - Disambiguation list of people with 'Udal' as their surname